Nitroscanate (trade name Lopatol) is an anthelmintic drug used in veterinary medicine to treat Toxocara canis, Toxascaris leonina, Ancylostoma caninum, Uncinaria stenocephala, Taenia, and Dipylidium caninum (roundworms, hookworms and tapeworms).

References 

Anthelmintics
Isothiocyanates
Nitrobenzenes